Leslie Miller (16 June 1880 – 2 July 1963) was an Australian cricketer. He played one first-class cricket match for Victoria in 1910.

See also
 List of Victoria first-class cricketers

References

External links
 

1880 births
1963 deaths
Australian cricketers
Victoria cricketers
Cricketers from Melbourne